Gaz Pir (also Romanized as Gaz Pīr; also known as Gaspīr) is a village in Byaban Rural District, Byaban District, Minab County, Hormozgan Province, Iran. At the 2006 census, its population was 240, in 39 families.

References 

Populated places in Minab County